Can't Buy Your Way is album by the progressive bluegrass band Northern Lights.

Track listing 
 Can't Buy Your Way (Armerding) 4:56
 My Only One (Mellyn) 3:57
 Lighthouse (Taylor) 4:13
 When the Time Had Fully Come (Armerding) 2:46
 September's End (Henry) 3:58
 Rainmaker (Nicholson, Rowan) 5:17
 City on a Hill (Armerding) 3:14
 Take You Back Again (Armerding) 3:14
 Heartache Tonight (Frey, Henley, Seeger, Souther) 3:03
 Shake This Feeling (Henry) 2:54
 Jubilation (Kropp) 4:11
 Anger and Tears (Chase, Smith) 3:42
 On the Edge (Armerding) 2:48

Personnel 
 Taylor Armerding - mandolin, guitar, vocals
 Jeff Horton - bass, vocals
 Bill Henry - vocals, guitar
 Mike Kropp - banjo, guitar

with
 Matt Glaser - violin
 Vassar Clements - violin
 Stuart Duncan - violin

References

External links 
 Official site

1991 albums
Northern Lights (bluegrass band) albums